The superior anastomotic vein, also known as the vein of Trolard, is a superficial cerebral vein grouped with the superior cerebral veins. The vein was eponymously named after the 18th century anatomist Jean Baptiste Paulin Trolard. The vein anastomoses with the middle cerebral vein and the superior sagittal sinus.

Additional Images

External links
 Radiopaedia Definition

Veins of the head and neck